Cornelius Pass Road is an arterial road over Cornelius Pass in the Tualatin Mountains west of Portland, Oregon, United States, also extending several miles to the south. Running north–south, the road stretches between U.S. Route 30 (US 30) on the north and Kinnaman Street, just south of Oregon Route 8 (OR 8), on the south. TriMet's MAX Light Rail line (Blue Line or Westside MAX) travels over the road on a bridge. The section between US 30 in Burlington and U.S. Route 26 (Sunset Highway) in Hillsboro is Oregon Route 127 (OR 127), known in the Oregon state highway system as Cornelius Pass Highway No. 127 (see Oregon highways and routes).

Route description

Cornelius Pass Road begins at an intersection with Southeast Kinnaman Street in southern Hillsboro, just under a mile south of the Tualatin Valley Highway (OR 8). It travels north across a set of railroad tracks and intersects OR 8 before continuing into Hillsboro's suburban neighborhoods. The street passes under a viaduct carrying light rail trains on the Blue Line near Quatama station near the Orenco Woods Nature Park.

From the undercrossing, the highway travels through several business parks on the east side of Intel's main factory, connected by the intersecting Cornell Road and Evergreen Parkway. Cornelius Pass Road then reaches an interchange with U.S. Route 26 (the Sunset Highway) and turns northeast as it leaves Hillsboro. The highway winds its way around farms and forestland as it ascends into the Tualatin Mountains, reaching its highest point at Cornelius Pass, elevation . The narrow road then descends from the mountains along McCarthy Creek and approaches the Multnomah Channel of the Columbia River, terminating at an intersection with U.S. Route 30 northwest of Portland.

Cornelius Pass is one of only two main north–south connecting roads in Hillsboro. The former country road handles 11,000 drivers each day and is an arterial route from the Tualatin Valley between Hillsboro to the Columbia River north of Portland. A mountainous road at points, 1,500 of the 11,000 vehicles each day are tractor-trailers on the road designed to handle up to 10,000 vehicles per day.

The section between US 26 and US 30 is signed as Oregon Route 127 (OR 127) and maintained by the Oregon Department of Transportation (ODOT). A portion of the road, from US 26 to Cornell, is part of the National Highway System.

History
The road was built by Thomas R. Cornelius in the 19th century. The interchange with the Sunset Highway (US 26) was rebuilt and widened in 1989, and the road widened to five lanes from the freeway to Cornell Road the following year. In 1996, the road was extended southward when 216th and 219th avenues were renamed and became the southern section of the road, terminating at Tualatin Valley Highway. At that time, the intersection with Baseline Road was re-aligned, but most of the extension was simply a renaming of 216th Avenue. The intersection with US 26 was altered in 2005 with new on- and off-ramps extending from Cornelius Pass to the east, where a railroad overpass had previously been located. In 2008, the entire Multnomah County section was changed to a no-passing zone on the winding road over the Tualatin Mountains.

A one-mile section from Lois to Wilkins streets closed for eight months in 2010 in order to widen the road in that area to five lanes as well as add bike lanes and sidewalks. The $12 million project included a new  bridge over Beaverton Creek. The county hoped to widen the remaining portion of the road to five lanes between Walbridge/Aloclek and Wilkins. Announced in 2011, the expected cost was $10.1 million and would include a new bridge over Rock Creek. Construction closed the section for six months, with the new bridge opening on December 31, 2012; at that time, the remaining widening was expected to continue until the middle of 2013. 

Hillsboro also began preliminary work in 2011 to extend Cornelius Pass south of Tualatin Valley Highway to prepare for the development of South Hillsboro. The Oregon Legislature approved $9.5 million in 2012 to fund safety improvements such as guardrails. Hillsboro also announced plans in 2012 to widen the road to seven lanes between Cornell and US 26. The widening project was completed in March 2017 at a total cost of $18.3 million.

Construction began in 2016 on the extension of Cornelius Pass Road south of Tualatin Valley Highway. The new section crosses Portland & Western Railroad tracks and takes Cornelius Pass Road into the under-construction South Hillsboro area.

In July 2019, a  stretch of Cornelius Pass Road between US 30 and NW Germantown Road began an 11-week closure. This stretch of road had experienced a high rate of crashes in preceding years, and Multnomah County closed the road so that safety improvements could be carried out, including curve realignment and widening of shoulders.

Work continued on an extension of the road to a newly-built intersection with Kinnaman Road through 2021. Meanwhile on February 16, 2021, the Washington County Board of Commissioners approved the reallocation of $8 million, previously reserved for a bridge replacement project on nearby Century Blvd, to partially fund the construction of a 5-lane bridge carrying Cornelius Pass Road over Butternut Creek. This would further extend the road south from its current terminus. Construction of the bridge, expected to cost $13 million, is scheduled to be carried out in 2022 and 2023.

The section of the road between US 26 and US 30 was transferred to the Oregon Department of Transportation on March 1, 2021, becoming Oregon Route 127. The transfer had been approved by the state legislature in 2017.

A $29.5 million project under consideration would widen the road to 5 lanes between Francis and Tualatin Valley Highway (the last remaining three-lane portion of the road south of US 26) and would additionally install a 45-inch drinking water pipeline beneath the road.

Major intersections

See also

Imbrie Farm

References

Roads in Oregon
Transportation in Hillsboro, Oregon
Transportation in Washington County, Oregon
Transportation in Multnomah County, Oregon